The Tukulan is a river in the Sakha Republic (Yakutia), Russia, a right tributary of the Aldan, part of the Lena basin. 

There are no settlements in the area of the river. The nearest inhabited places are Batamay of Kobyaysky District to the west of the Tukulan's mouth and Udarnik, Krest-Khaldzhay and Ary-Tolon of Tompo District to the east.

Course
The Tukulan originates in Lake Ulakhan-Kyuel, a  mountain lake of the southwestern Verkhoyansk Range located in Ust-Aldan District. In the upper section of its course the river flows across mountainous terrain, heading roughly southwestwards across the Sordogin Range. 

After leaving the mountainous area the Tukulan flows approximately in the same SW direction along its middle course. It crosses a floodplain dotted with about 200 lakes where the riverbed divides into slowly-flowing arms. Its lower course is a vast marshy area. Finally the Tukulan meets the right bank of the Aldan River, a little upstream from the mouth of the Kele and downstream of the Baray,  from the confluence of the Aldan with the Lena. The river freezes between mid October and mid May.

See also
List of rivers of Russia

References

Rivers of the Sakha Republic
Verkhoyansk Range
Central Yakutian Lowland